To the Gory End is the first album by British death metal band Cancer. The cover artwork was censored in some countries, with only the band's name and album title left on a black background. The image is a painting based on a still from the 1978 horror film, Dawn of the Dead.

Track listing

Tracks recorded live at Wrexham Memorial Hall, August 31, 1990.

Personnel
Cancer
John Walker - Vocals, Guitars
Ian Buchanan - Bass
Carl Stokes - Drums

Additional musicians
John Tardy - Backing Vocals on "Die Die"
Tim Lewis - Keyboards on "Die Die" and "To the Gory End"

Production
Scott Burns - Mixing, Producer
Carl Stokes - Cover art
Phil Higgins - Photography
Tim Lewis - Engineering

References

Cancer (band) albums
1990 debut albums
Albums produced by Scott Burns (record producer)